(born October 15, 1990) is an American professional basketball player for Shinshu Brave Warriors in Japan.

References

External links
Hillsdale bio

1990 births
Living people
American expatriate basketball people in Japan
American expatriate basketball people in Luxembourg
American expatriate basketball people in Spain
American men's basketball players
Basketball players from Michigan
Hillsdale Chargers men's basketball players
People from Northville, Michigan
Shinshu Brave Warriors players
Power forwards (basketball)